Micah Stephen Williams (born February 16, 1991) is an American former actor, best known for his recurring role as Emmett on the Disney Channel sitcom Good Luck Charlie. 
Williams began his acting career having a small guest role in the series The Pretender. He went on to guest star in other television series including Grounded for Life, Lizzie McGuire, Joan of Arcadia, In Justice, Just For Kicks and The Office. He had a small role in the 2003 film Bruce Almighty, he also co-starred in the films Like Mike 2: Streetball and Jump In!.

In 2006, he received a Young Artist Award nomination for Best Performance in a TV Movie, Miniseries or Special (Comedy or Drama) - Leading Young Actor in the television film The Ron Clark Story.

Filmography

References

External links

1991 births
21st-century American male actors
American male child actors
American male film actors
American male television actors
Living people
Male actors from Long Beach, California
African-American male actors
21st-century African-American people